Parastega hemisigna is a moth in the family Gelechiidae. It was described by Clarke in 1951. It is found in Argentina.

References

Gelechiinae
Moths described in 1951